Woodball at the 2010 Asian Beach Games was held from 10 December to 13 December 2010 in Muscat, Oman.

Medalists

Medal table

Results

Men's singles
10–13 December

Men's team
10–13 December

Women's singles
10–13 December

Women's team
10–13 December

References
 Official site

2010 Asian Beach Games events
2010